The 2019–20 Algerian Ligue Professionnelle 1 was the 58th season of the Algerian Ligue Professionnelle 1 since its establishment in 1962. A total of 16 teams contested the league. The Ligue Professionnelle 1 kicked off on August 15, 2019, this time without an official sponsorship for the first time since 2008–09, Mobilis ATM did nothing to renew the contract. On September 17, at the Extraordinary General Assembly of Algerian Football Federation, it unanimously endorses the change of the competition system by increasing the number of clubs from 16 to 18, as for the second division to 32 clubs from two groups Central East and Central West from 16 clubs also became the number of professional clubs 18 instead of 32 starting from the season 2020–21. On September 30, at the monthly statutory meeting held in Ouargla. After debate and exchanges between the members, the Federal Office opted for the variant favoring the relegation of two clubs of the Ligue Professionnelle 1 and the promotion of four clubs of the League 2 to the upper tier.

On March 15, 2020, the Ligue de Football Professionnel (LFP) decided to halt the season due to the COVID-19 pandemic in Algeria. On July 29, 2020, the LFP declared that season is over and CR Belouizdad to be the champion, the promotion of four teams from the League 2, and scraping the relegation for the current season.

Teams
16 teams contest the league. US Biskra, NC Magra and ASO Chlef were promoted from the 2018–19 Ligue 2.

Stadiums
Note: Table lists in alphabetical order.

Personnel and kits

Managerial changes

Foreign players

League table

Results

Positions by round

Clubs season-progress

Season statistics

Leader week after week

The bottom of the table week after week

Top scorers

Updated to games played on 15 March 2020 Source: soccerway.com

Hat-tricks

Clean sheets

Media coverage

See also
2019–20 Algerian Ligue Professionnelle 2
2019–20 Algerian Cup

Notes

References

Algerian Ligue Professionnelle 1 seasons
Algeria
1
Algerian Ligue Professionnelle 1, 2019-20